Matthew Scott Haack (born July 25, 1994) is an American football punter who is a free agent. He played college football at Arizona State. He played his first four seasons with the Miami Dolphins, who signed him as an undrafted free agent in 2017. Haack later spent one season with the Buffalo Bills before joining the Colts in 2022.

High school career
Haack graduated from Dowling Catholic High School in 2013. He was rated by Rivals.com as the No. 15 kicker in the nation and the state of Iowa's No. 10 overall prospect. On September 14, 2018, Haack was inducted into the Dowling Catholic High School/St. Joseph Academy Athletic Hall of Fame for his exemplary high school career.

College career
Haack attended and played college football for Arizona State from 2013 to 2016. In the 2013 season, he shared the punting duties with Alex Garoutte, Dom Vizzare, and Taylor Kelly. He finished with 16 punts for 612 net yards for a 38.3 average. In the 2014 season, he handled most of the punting duties with Taylor Kelly and Mike Bercovici handling the rest of the work. He finished with 53 punts for 2,296 net yards for a 43.3 average. In the 2015 season, he handled all but three punts, which went to Bercovici. He finished with 74 punts for 3,186 net yards for a 43.1 average. He finished fifth nationally and fourth in the Pac-12 in averaging 43.1 yards per punt in 2015. As a senior in 2016, he handled all of the team's punts except for three by teammate Manny Wilkins. He had 66 punts for 2,897 net yards for a 44.4 average.

Professional career

Miami Dolphins
On May 5, 2017, Haack was signed as an undrafted free agent to a three-year, $1.67 million contract.

He earned the Dolphins starting punter job as a rookie, beating out incumbent punter Matt Darr.

On September 17, 2017, he made his NFL debut against the Los Angeles Chargers. He had three punts for 130 total yards (43.33 average). Overall, in the 2017 season, he finished with 83 punts for 3,695 net yards for a 44.52 average.

In Week 9 of the 2018 season, Haack was named AFC Special Teams Player of the Week after averaging 44.7 yards on nine punts in a 13-6 win over the New York Jets. Overall, Haack had 87 punts for 3,884 net yards for a 44.64-yard average in the 2018 season.

On December 1, 2019, Haack was the centerpiece of a trick play in which he completed a one-yard touchdown pass to kicker Jason Sanders in the end zone during the 37–31 win, marking the NFL's first touchdown pass to a kicker since October 16, 1977. Overall, Haack had 69 punts for 3,105 net yards for a 45.00-yard average in the 2019 season.

On April 1, 2020, Haack was re-signed to a one-year, $2.133 million contract.

Buffalo Bills
On March 18, 2021, Haack signed a three-year contract with the Buffalo Bills. He was released on August 22, 2022, after losing the punter position to rookie Matt Araiza.

Indianapolis Colts
On August 24, 2022, Haack signed a one-year contract with the Indianapolis Colts.

NFL career statistics

|-
! style="text-align:center;"| 2017
! style="text-align:center;"| MIA
| 16 || 83 || 3,695 || 44.5 || 40.7 || 30 || 5
|-
! style="text-align:center;"| 2018
! style="text-align:center;"| MIA
| 16 || 87 || 3,884 || 44.6 || 38.4 || 35 || 6
|-
! style="text-align:center;"| 2019
! style="text-align:center;"| MIA
| 16 || 69 || 3,105 || 45.0 || 41.1 || 23 || 2
|-
! style="text-align:center;"| 2020
! style="text-align:center;"| MIA
| 16 || 68 || 3,040 || 44.7 || 39.8 || 26 || 2 
|-
! style="text-align:center;"|2021
! style="text-align:center;"|BUF
| 17 || 50 || 2,224 || 44.5 || 39.8 || 17 || 7
|-
! style="text-align:center;" colspan="2"| Career || 81 || 357|| 15,948 || 44.7 || 40.0 || 131 || 22
|}

References

External links
Twitter
Miami Dolphins bio
Arizona State Sun Devils bio

1994 births
Living people
People from West Des Moines, Iowa
Players of American football from Iowa
American football punters
Arizona State Sun Devils football players
Buffalo Bills players
Miami Dolphins players
Indianapolis Colts players